Following is a list of books allegedly written by Turkish cult leader Adnan Oktar (born February 2, 1956), also known by the pen name Harun Yahya. Oktar and his cult are advocates of Islamic creationism.

Credited works

Children's books
 Children Darwin Was Lying!
 The World of Animals
 The Splendour in the Skies
 The World of Our Little Friends: The Ants
 Honeybees That Build Perfect Combs
 Skillful Dam Builders: Beavers

Booklets
 "The Mystery of the Atom"
 "The Collapse of the Theory of Evolution: The Fact of Creation"
 "The Collapse of Materialism"
 "The End of Materialism"
 "The Blunders of Evolutionists 1"
 "The Blunders of Evolutionists 2"
 "The Microbiological Collapse of Evolution"
 "The Fact of Creation"
 "The Collapse of the Theory of Evolution in 20 Questions"
 "The Biggest Deception in the History of Biology: Darwinism"

Works on Quranic topics

References

External links
Adnan Oktar's books for download

Bibliographies by writer
Bibliographies of Turkish writers
Religious bibliographies
Children's literature bibliographies